Klein Glienicke (literally Little Glienicke) was an independent village and is now part of Potsdam. It lies on the south-western part of Berlin's Wannsee Hamlet. In the center of the original village is the building Jagdschloss Glienicke. During the period of the partition of Germany Klein-Glienicke was in effect an exclave, a "special security zone" of the German Democratic Republic and sometimes referred to as an "appendix of the GDR". Since 1990 parts of the village have been protected as a UNESCO World Heritage site.

External links 

Geography of Potsdam
Districts of Potsdam